に, in hiragana, or ニ in katakana, is one of the Japanese kana, which each represent one mora. The hiragana is written in three strokes, while the katakana in two.

Notably, the katakana (ニ) is functionally identical to the kanji for two (二), pronounced the same way, and written similarly.

に is used as a particle, with a similar function to the English "to", "in", "at", or "by":

Stroke order

The hiragana に is made with three strokes:
A vertical stroke from top to bottom.
A short, horizontal stroke to the upper right of the first stroke, going from left to right.
Another short, horizontal stroke at the bottom right of the first stroke, going from left to right.

The katakana ニ is made with two strokes:
 At the top, a horizontal stroke from left to right.
 Another, longer horizontal stroke under the first stroke

Other communicative representations

 Full Braille representation

 Computer encodings

See also
 Japanese grammar

References
Handbook of Japanese Grammar - Masahiro Tanimori (Tuttle 1994)

Specific kana